The Drunk and On Drugs Happy Funtime Hour is a Canadian television comedy series, which aired during the 2011 television season on Action.

Described by its producers as "Curb Your Enthusiasm after it got smashed in the head with a hammer and force-fed liquor and drugs", the show stars Trailer Park Boys actors John Paul Tremblay, Robb Wells and Mike Smith as fictionalized versions of themselves. The fictional trio are starring in a new sketch comedy series, Happy Funtime Hour, but their production goes awry when a mad scientist named Doctor Funtime (Maury Chaykin) forces them to ingest a hallucinogenic substance he created. The actors must endure unpredictable events while constantly meeting different characters. The show features high quality prosthetic and makeup work to portray a wide range of off-the-wall characters, including pirates, superheroes, mafia, WWII Canadian (sandwich) soldiers (armed with live rounds), drug dealers, cult members, ambulance drivers, etc. Particularly disturbing characters abound, such as an armless pizza chef, a cleaner who appears to use his enormous dangling tongue, and an old gypsy woman who pays for "sugar," a euphemism for male loving. The sequences between characters feature segues such as tvs or radios, and the show features shifts of perspective from present day to WWII or pirates.

Cast
The supporting cast includes Maury Chaykin, John Dunsworth, Patrick Roach, Jay Baruchel, Richard Collins, Amy Sedaris and Luke Gordon. All three main actors also play numerous minor and one-off characters, utilizing an array of prosthetics.

Premiere
The series premiered in Canada on 22 July 2011, and aired two episodes three Friday evenings in a row. Due to poor reception and also because of the death of Maury Chaykin, the series has been cancelled.  Chaykin's "mad scientist" character had already been re-cast once; musician Alex Lifeson was originally set to take on that role before bowing out in early 2010.

List of characters

John Paul Tremblay
 John Paul Tremblay (Himself)
 Sammy Brutto
 Karen Sunshine
 Captain Reginald Scary
 Chip
 Flex Fearless
 Lightning Stick O'Leigh
 Paul Colomb

Robb Wells
 Robb Wells (Himself)
 Stabby Brutto
 Moley Brutto
 Chris Tall 
 Russfert Thelonious Diggins 
 Chase Lightning 
 Rico 
 Kris Kream

Mike Smith
 Mike Smith (Himself)
 Don Brutto
 Joelp Fuckerton
 Elson Bandle-Hiover 
 Liza
 Peter P. Squalls 
 Blaise 
 Captain Mega Power 
 DJ Dazzie Daddle

Other characters
 K. Money
 Samantha
 Sasquatch
 Jackson Packinsteel
 Papa Karlson
 Dr. Funtime
 Maury Chaykin (Himself)
 Potatoes
 Dr. Fieldiveory
 Cincinnati Harry
 Big Ron
 Commander Mayo
 Speedy Pete
 Falcon
 Patrick Roach (Himself)

Sandwich Soldiers
 Jay Baruchel
 Andrew Bush
 Daniel Lillford
 Jason Daley
 Michael Ray Fox

List of episodes

References

External links

 Drunk and on Drugs official website
 Port Cockerton - fictional town where the series is set
 Happy Funtime Hour - fictional series within the television series
 Official Facebook page 
 Official YouTube channel
 Official Twitter account

Showcase (Canadian TV channel) original programming
2011 Canadian television series debuts
2011 Canadian television series endings
2010s Canadian satirical television series
Canadian mockumentary television series
Television series by Entertainment One
Television series by Corus Entertainment